is a Japanese football player for Suzuka Unlimited FC.

Club statistics
Updated to 23 February 2017.

References

External links

Profile at Ehime FC

1990 births
Living people
Association football people from Hokkaido
Japanese footballers
J1 League players
J2 League players
Hokkaido Consadole Sapporo players
Ehime FC players
Suzuka Point Getters players
Association football goalkeepers
Sportspeople from Sapporo